Birmingham Cathedral may refer to:
In Birmingham, England
St Philip's Cathedral, Birmingham (Church of England)
St Chad's Cathedral, Birmingham (Catholic)
St Andrew's Cathedral, Birmingham (Orthodox) 
In Birmingham, Alabama
Cathedral Church of the Advent (Birmingham, Alabama) (Episcopalian)
Cathedral of Saint Paul in Birmingham (Catholic)
Holy Trinity - Holy Cross Cathedral (Orthodox)